Major Sir Murdoch McKenzie Wood OBE, DL (19 July 1881 – 11 October 1949) was a Scottish Liberal politician.

Background
He was the second son of James Wood of Cullen, Banffshire, and 	
Christina McKenzie. He was educated at Fordyce Academy and Edinburgh University. He was awarded the OBE in 1919. In 1924 he married Muriel Davis. He was a Deputy Lieutenant for Banffshire and was knighted in 1932.

Professional career
He received a call to the bar by Gray's Inn in 1910. He was on the editorial staff of the Daily Mail. In World War I he served with the Gordon Highlanders and was severely wounded. He later served with the administrative staff of the Royal Air Force.

Political career
He was the unsuccessful Liberal Party parliamentary candidate for the Unionist seat of Ayr Burghs in 1918 where the intervention of a Labour Party candidate prevented what would otherwise have been a rare gain for the Liberals; 

He entered Parliament as Liberal MP for Aberdeenshire Central at a by-election in April 1919. This was a notable gain for the opposition Liberals against a Unionist candidate supported by the Coalition Government;

He was comfortably re-elected at the following general election;

Following re-union between Asquith and Lloyd George, he was comfortably re-elected at the next election;

He served as the Scottish Liberal Whip from 1923–1924. At the following general election, a Labour candidate intervened and split the anti-Unionist vote, which cost him his seat;

He switched to contest Banffshire for the 1929 United Kingdom general election. He comfortably re-gained a seat the Liberals had lost in 1924;

In 1931, following the formation of the National Government, he was returned unopposed at the general election as a supporter of the new administration. He was an unpaid Assistant Government Whip from 1931–1932. When the Liberal party left the National Government he continued in the role of Scottish Liberal Whip from 1932–1934. In 1935 he was defeated at Banffshire;

He did not stand for parliament again.

External links

References

1881 births
1949 deaths
Alumni of the University of Edinburgh
Deputy Lieutenants of Banffshire
Gordon Highlanders officers
Knights Bachelor
Scottish Liberal Party MPs
People educated at Fordyce Academy
Royal Air Force officers
Members of the Parliament of the United Kingdom for Scottish constituencies
Officers of the Order of the British Empire
UK MPs 1918–1922
UK MPs 1922–1923
UK MPs 1923–1924
UK MPs 1929–1931
UK MPs 1931–1935